Al Ard Film Festival is an international film festival aimed at popularising Palestinian and Arab culture and art. The festival takes place in Cagliari (Sardinia) once a year and has been organised since 2002 by the Associazione Amicizia Sardegna Palestina (Sardinia-Palestina Friendship Association), a volunteering organisation founded in 1997 in the Mediterranean island.

One of the frequent guests of Al Ard Film Festival in Sardinia is Monica Maurer, who also directed films about the Palestinian revolution in the 1970s.

History 
The first edition of Al Ard (meaning "The Land" in Arabic) was held in Cagliari, and, since then, it has grown in popularity and international reach, attracting a diverse and engaged audience. The festival has become a beloved and eagerly anticipated annual event for the local community, and its success has helped to put Cagliari on the map as a destination for film enthusiasts even from outside the island.

Mission 
Since its first edition, the mission of the event has been to promote fundamental rights, such as the right of self-determination, with a particular focus on Palestine. Started as a small local event, over the years, Al Ard has become an international film festival, and it is now among the most popular events about the Arab world in Southern Europe.

Editions 
The festival has been held annually since 2002 and has grown to become a major cultural event in the region. The 19th edition of Al Ard Film Festival took place in February 2023 at the Teatro Massimo in Cagliari. The festival attracts international guests, some of whom have been part of the Jury multiple times, such as Monica Maurer, Ibrahim Nasrallah, May Odeh, and many other were invited as filmmakers candidates for awards, such as Mai Masri, Sahera Dirbas, Mohammed Alatar, Kasim Abid, Elia Ghorbia, Linda Paganelli, Habib Ayeb, and many more.

References

External links
Official website

Film festivals in Italy